In cycling, cadence (or pedalling rate) is a measure of angular speed calculated as the number of revolutions of the crank per minute; this is the rate at which a cyclist is pedalling/turning the pedals.  Cadence is directly proportional to wheel speed, but is a distinct measurement and changes with gearing—which determines the ratio of crank rpm to wheel rpm.

Cyclists typically have a cadence at which they feel most comfortable, and on bicycles with many gears it is possible to maintain a preferred cadence at a wide range of speeds. Recreational and utility cyclists typically cycle around 60–80 rpm. According to cadence measurement of seven professional cyclists during three-week races they cycle about 90 rpm during flat and long (~190 km) group stages and individual time trials of ~50 km. During ~15 km uphill cycling on high mountain passes they cycle about 70 rpm.
Cyclists choose cadence to minimise muscular fatigue, and not metabolic demand, since oxygen consumption is lower at cadences 60-70 rpm. 

While fast cadence is also referred to as "spinning", slow cadence is referred to as "mashing" or "grinding".

Any particular cyclist has only a narrow range of preferred cadences, often smaller than the general ranges listed above. This in turn influences the number and range of gears which are appropriate for any particular cycling conditions.

Certain cyclocomputers are able to measure cadence, and relay the reading to the cyclist via ANT + or Bluetooth radio to a smartphone, GPS bike computer, or LCD display, typically mounted on the bicycle's handlebars. Simple bicycle computers measure cadence with a reed switch and a magnet once a revolution, while more advanced computers use a torque sensor, power meter, or a Pedal Assist Sensor.

See also
Cycling power meter
Bicycle gearing
Tachometer — a motor vehicle's tachometer is analogous to a bicycle's cadence; they are both measurements of the drive-train's rotational speed prior to the "transmission" (derailleur)

References

External links

Cycling
Road bicycle racing terminology
Velocity